Neomasiphya is a genus of parasitic flies in the family Tachinidae. There are at least two described species in Neomasiphya.

Species
These two species belong to the genus Neomasiphya:
 Neomasiphya lenkoi Guimaraes, 1966
 Neomasiphya thompsoni Guimaraes, 1966

References

Further reading

 
 
 
 

Tachinidae
Articles created by Qbugbot